Zubin Eruch Surkari (born 26 February 1980) is a Canadian cricketer. He is a right-handed batsman and a right-arm medium pace bowler. Surkari has represented Canada in six ICC Intercontinental Cup matches, 12 List A matches, the 2004 ICC Americas Championship and the 2005 ICC Trophy. He has a highest first-class score of 139, scored against the UAE in the semi-final of the 2004 ICC Intercontinental Cup.

He has the distinction of being one of a handful of players given out Obstructing the Field in a First Class match, in an ICC Intercontinental Cup match vs Afghanistan on 4 August 2011.

References

External links
Cricket Archive profile

1980 births
Living people
Canadian cricketers
Canada One Day International cricketers
Canada Twenty20 International cricketers
Cricketers from Ontario
Cricketers at the 2011 Cricket World Cup
Sportspeople from Toronto
Canadian people of Indian descent
Parsi people